{{Infobox album
| name       = Bangin' on Wax
| type       = studio
| artist     = Bloods & Crips
| cover      = Banging_on_Wax.jpg
| alt        =
| released   = March 9, 1993
| recorded   = 1992-1993
| venue      =
| studio     =
| genre      = G-funk, gangsta rap
| length     = 71:21
| label      = Dangerous Records
| producer   = Ron "Ronnie Ron" Phillips, Tweedy Bird Loc, Jerome Evans (Silkski), Battlecat, David Scott Lindley Big Qluso J. Stank
| prev_title =
| prev_year  =
| next_title = Bangin' on Wax 2... The Saga Continues
| next_year  = 1994
| misc       = {{Singles
 | name        = Bangin' on Wax
 | type        = studio
 | single1     = Bangin' On Wax
 | single1date = 1993
 | single2     = Piru Love
 | single2date = 1993
 | single3     = Crip, Crip, Crip | single3date = 1993
 | single4     = Steady Dippin | single4date = 1993
}}
}}Bangin' on Wax is the debut album by American Hip hop group Bloods & Crips. The album was released in 1993 for Dangerous Records. Bangin' on Wax was a commercial success, making it to #86 on the Billboard 200. Four singles were released "Bangin' on Wax", "Piru Love", "Crip, Crip, Crip" and "Steady Dippin'". Music videos were made for Bangin' on Wax, Piru Love and ''Steady Dippin'''. The album was produced by Ronnie Ron, DJ Battlecat, Big Qluso, Siilski, Tweedy Bird Loc and J. Stank.

Track listing

Samples

Chart Awards

References 

Bloods & Crips albums
1993 debut albums
Albums produced by Battlecat (producer)
Albums produced by Silkski
Gangsta rap albums by American artists
G-funk albums